Matevž Vidovšek (born 30 October 1999) is a Slovenian professional footballer who plays as a goalkeeper for Olimpija Ljubljana.

Club career
Vidovšek started his football career at local side Dravograd. In 2016, at the age of 16, he moved to the youth ranks of Serie A team Atalanta, and was later loaned to Italian teams Pescara and Reggina 1914, and Cypriot club Ayia Napa.

In September 2020, he signed a two-year contract with Slovenian PrvaLiga side Olimpija Ljubljana. He made his PrvaLiga debut in May 2022, in the last round of the 2021–22 Slovenian PrvaLiga season, keeping a clean sheet in a 2–0 away win over Celje.

References

External links
 Player profile at NZS 

1999 births
Living people
Sportspeople from Slovenj Gradec
Slovenian footballers
Association football goalkeepers
Atalanta B.C. players
Delfino Pescara 1936 players
Reggina 1914 players
Ayia Napa FC players
NK Olimpija Ljubljana (2005) players
Cypriot Second Division players
Slovenian PrvaLiga players
Slovenia youth international footballers
Slovenian expatriate footballers
Slovenian expatriate sportspeople in Italy
Expatriate footballers in Italy
Slovenian expatriate sportspeople in Cyprus
Expatriate footballers in Cyprus